This is a list of bridges and viaducts in Denmark, including those for pedestrians and vehicular traffic.

Major road and railway bridges

Alphabetical list 
 Aggersund Bridge
 Alssund Bridge
 Farø Bridges
 Fehmarn Belt Fixed Link: A bridge was proposed as one means of spanning the Fehmarn Belt (to Germany)
 Frederick IX Bridge
 Great Belt Fixed Link
 Guldborgsund Bridge
 Knippelsbro
 Langebro
 Langeland Bridge
 Lille Langebro
 Limfjordsbroen
 Little Belt Bridge
 Little Belt Bridge (1970)
 Masnedsund Bridge
 Munkholm Bridge
 Oresund Bridge (Connects to Sweden)
 Queen Alexandrine Bridge
 Ravning Bridge (demolished)
 Sallingsund Bridge
 Siøsund Bridge
 Storstrøm Bridge
 Svendborgsund Bridge
 Teglværksbroen
 Vejle Fjord Bridge
 Vilsund Bridge

Notes and references 
 

 Others references

See also 

 List of tunnels of the Faroe Islands
 Transport in Denmark
 Transport in Greenland
 Rail transport in Denmark
 Motorways in Denmark
 Geography of Denmark

External links

Further reading 
 

Denmark
 
Bridges
Bridges